Hasan Hairetdin Kanykoff (Каныков: Kanykov - Tatar: Xäsän Xäyretdin Qanıyqov (Qanıyq), Хәсән Хәйретдин Каныйков; February 27, 1880 – May 3, 1954) was a Tatar political activist in Finland. He also worked as a merchant and among his community was known as someone who helped fellow Tatar tradesmen settle in the country, especially by showing them how business works.

Life 
Hasan Kanykoff (Kanıyk), son of Hairetdin was born on February 27, 1880. He was from Nizhny Novgorod Governorate - a Tatar village named Aktuk. Kanykoff came to Finland in 1895. He's known to have lived at least in Helsinki, Tampere, Hämeenlinna, and for a while in Sweden.

Kanykoff, like other Tatars of his generation operated as a merchant. Among his fellow tradesmen, he had a kind of leader's position; he demanded everyone to get an official licence for their business on Finnish soil. In settling into the country, they also got help from some local university people, who for example helped them with the language and explained them the political situation during the times of Russification of Finland. One of these people was a linguist named Heikki Paasonen, who had traveled to Aktuk in late 1800s and collected information on the Mishar Tatars.

Kanykoff, with another Tatar activist Sarif Daher (1884-1959) and some Finnish like minded people established an association called Etuvartiokansojen klubi in fall 1919. It operated until 1928 and its purpose was to establish co-operation between the minorities in Russia and the then-new states that had separated from Russia. Before this, Kanykoff had friended linguist G.J. Ramstedt and professor Yrjö Jahnsson, who were interested in the pursuits for independence of Tatars. Jahnsson helped Kanykoff acquire Finnish citizenship in 1921. He also helped get the children of Kanykoff into the country. The first wife of Hasan Kanykoff was Haditshä Ainetdin, who died in 1917. The second was Zölihä Mangushoff. Kanykoff had children Halisä, Djagfär, Hamzä, Hafisä, Feyezrahman, Ädhäm. His older brother was Silaletdin (1866-1930). Daughter Hafisä died as a child during an epidemic. One of the sons, Feyez, was killed while serving during the Winter War. Two of them served in the Winter War and the Continuation War as lieutenants. The boys wanted to get rid of the Russian suffix (-off) but couldn't come to an agreement on what the name should be, so they came up with: Kayenuk/Kajenuk, Kanukhan.

The writer Sabira Ståhlberg is Kanykoff's granddaughter.

Hasan Kanykoff died May 3, 1954, in Järvenpää.

References 

Finnish Tatars
Finnish activists
1880 births
1954 deaths
Finnish merchants
Tatar people from the Russian Empire